Tonto is the fictional sidekick to the Lone Ranger, an American Western character.

Tonto may also refer to:

People
 Tonto Apache, one of the groups of Western Apache people in the US
 Tonto Dikeh (born 1985), Nigerian actress, singer, and philanthropist
 Tonto Coleman (1907–1973), American football coach and sports administrator

Places

US state of Arizona
 Tonto Basin, a watershed in the center of the state
 Tonto Basin, Arizona, a census-designated place in Gila County
 Tonto Creek, a stream along the Mogollon Rim 
 Tonto National Forest, a US national forest
 Tonto National Monument, a US national monument
 Tonto Natural Bridge, a travertine arch in Gila County
 Tonto Trail, a hiking trail on the South Rim of the Grand Canyon
 Tonto Village, Arizona, a census-designated place in Gila County

Mexico
 Tonto River, a river in the state of Oaxaca

Entertainment
 Tonto (Metabarons), a character in the Metabarons comic book
 El Tonto, an American comedy film in production 
 TONTO, an acronym for the synthesizer system of Tonto's Expanding Head Band
 "Tonto" (song), by the American math rock band Battles, from their album Mirrored
 Tonto+, the EP centered on the song

Other uses
 Tonto (beverage), an alcoholic beverage from Uganda
 Tonto Group, a geologic formation visible in the Grand Canyon

See also

 Merlin Tonto, a hybrid personal computer/telecommunications terminal
 Under the Tonto Rim (disambiguation)
Tonho (name)
Tonio (name)
Toñito (name)
Tonko